Mohlanapeng Airstrip  is an airstrip serving the Mohlanapeng community in Thaba-Tseka District, Lesotho.

See also

Transport in Lesotho
List of airports in Lesotho

References

External links
 Mohlanapeng
 OpenStreetMap - Mohlanapeng
 OurAirports - Mohlanapeng

Airports in Lesotho